DMAT scam is a ₹ 10,000 crore admission scam, which came fully into the limelight in June 2015 in Madhya Pradesh (India), when the Controller of Dental and Medical Admission Test (DMAT) exam, Yogesh Uprit was arrested. Indore based RTI activist and whistleblower Dr. Anand Rai was the first to complain against the mass irregularities in admissions into the private medical colleges. In 2015, he filed a petition in the Supreme Court of India demanding CBI investigation in the alleged scam. After hearing the plea, the Supreme Court of India said that DMAT scam is worse than the Vyapam scam. Thereafter, notices to Central and State governments were issued and were asked why the CBI probe should not be ordered. On August 13, 2015, CBI told the Supreme Court that the DMAT scam is many times larger than the Vyapam scam. However, due to shortage of manpower resources, it cannot be investigated by the agency. On September 4, 2015, the Supreme Court of India issued a notice to the Madhya Pradesh government and sought the reply from the state.

Scam 
Dental and Medical Admission Test (DMAT) is an examination held for admission into the private medical colleges of Madhya Pradesh, India. This exam is conducted by the Association for Private Medical and Dental Colleges (APDMC) and this scam had been running since its inception in 2006.
. An irregularity came to the forefront when the first complaint of fraud by Dr. Jai Chandra was made in 2013. Subsequently, on September 16, 2013, two people named Surendra Singh Chauhan and Ranveer Singh were arrested on the charges of duping around a dozen students from Andhra Pradesh for ₹ 1.35 crore. The duped students were promised admission in the private medical colleges of Madhya Pradesh.

An engineering student from Chhattisgarh, named Rocky was asked to interact with the aspirants and their kin, as the arrested duo were not good in spoken English. Later during the course of investigation, it was found that Rocky was no involved in the crime but was used only to interact with the victims.

Investigation 
After the confession of DMAT officials of being involved in the scam, the police team seized the hard disk and electronic records from the DMAT’s office. The arrested duo used to work as admission agents for engineering colleges and also helped students to clear the semester exams. However, in order to earn more, they shifted the focus towards admission in medical colleges, which is comparatively more lucrative. In 2013, police said that it is difficult to assess the depth of the scam but the financial background of accused is a clear indication of huge amount of money involved in it. By the end of 2013, around dozen interstate gangs were arrested.

The police tried to extract some information from the DMAT controller A W Khan, but he died on October 5, 2013 during interrogation. His death made the investigation hit the roadblock. However, later the investigating team found some lead that suggested the involvement of private medical college authorities in the forgery, which led to the arrest of Controller of Dental and Medical Admission Test (DMAT) exam, Yogesh Uprit.

In July 2015, the appellate authority of Admission and Fee Regulatory Committee (AFRC), a statutory body for professional colleges, pointed to a massive scam involving private colleges. The candidates used to pay between ₹ 15 Lakh to ₹ 1 crore to get the admission in undergraduate or postgraduate courses.

Modus operandi 
The gangs operated from internet cafes to the college premises. They used to introduce themselves as the personal assistants of college directors, doctors and claimed to yield considerable influence in the office of DMAT. The candidates who paid the amount were directed to leave the OMR sheet blank and were filled later. The state quota and NRI seats used to get filled up against the seats that were vacated on the last day of the admission process.

During the course of investigation, the police team found that the aspirants who paid to the gang used to get exact numbers in the examination as was needed to get the admission in the college of their choice.

Accused

Allegations against state government 
The investigation team had come across specific inputs on the involvement of ministers, judicial members, police officers and others at high position in the Madhya Pradesh government. Indore based whistleblower Dr. Anand Rai alleged that huge amount of black money is involved in the scam and the business of illegal admissions was going on since 2006.

Opposition party in the state Indian National Congress has alleged that Chief Minister Shivraj Singh Chouhan's kin were the beneficiaries in the DMAT scam. The charge has been strongly denied by the ruling Bharatiya Janta Party.

Exam cancellation 
Due to continuous revelations of collusion between Vyapam and DMAT authorities and threats from a whistleblower to name judges allegedly involved in the scam, the state examination body on July 10, 2015 cancelled the admission test to be held on July 12, 2015. However, the officials said that the examination was postponed due to some technical reasons.

References

Corruption in Madhya Pradesh